Michele Capobianco (Vitulano, 1921 - Naples, 2005) was an Italian architect, active in the city of Naples.

Biography 

Born in 1921 in the province of Benevento, Capobianco graduated in architecture in 1946. During his university years he was a student of Marcello Canino, in whose studio he worked since 1943. Immediately after graduating he opened a studio with Arrigo Marseille. In 1948 there were the first commissions: a building in Poggioreale (1948), the pavilion of Latin America (1948-52) and some residential buildings in the Commola Ricci park (1952–55). In 1950, following a visit carried out by a delegation of Swedish professors and students to study the new popular neighborhoods, Capobianco, urged by some Swedish architects, was invited to go to Sweden. In Stockholm he attended Sven Markelius and studied the Nordic urban culture. In 1955 he designed a residential building in Piazzetta Santo Stefano for which he won the Inarch prize in 1961, while at the same time with Giulio De Luca he designed the Decina building in the Grifeo Park.

In the sixties he was active, like many others, in the design of popular neighborhoods and in 1964, together with Riccardo Dalisi and Massimo Pica Ciamarra, he built the Palazzo della Nuova Borsa Merci. He became Emeritus Professor of Architectural Design at the Faculty of the Federico II University from 1973 to 1988. He collaborated with Pica Ciamarra and Corrado Beguinot on the design of the courthouse, whose work ended after the fire of the highest tower. His also the project for a new building for the 10th scientific high school (now Elio Vittorini high school) in the Arenella district, with the aim of serving above all the new Rione Alto. In the eighties he designed some popular districts in Miano made with a view to PSER, several buildings in the Centro Direzionale in Naples and the Vanvitelli, Medaglie d'Oro and Colli Aminei metro stations. In 1992 he won a second Inarch prize and later founded the architecture magazine ArQ. His son Lorenzo also embarked on a career as an architect, continuing some of his father's construction sites such as the restyling of the Vanvitelli station at Vomero, the first art station of the new Naples Metro project.

20th-century Italian architects
1921 births
2005 deaths
Architects from Naples